The 1967–68 Macedonian Republic League was the 24th since its establishment. Rabotnički Skopje won their 7th championship title.

Participating teams

Final table

External links
SportSport.ba
Football Federation of Macedonia 

Macedonian Football League seasons
Yugo
3